The Hotel del Charro was a resort hotel in La Jolla,
California, famous for its discreet hospitality to deal-making
politicians, wealthy industrialists, and Hollywood celebrities,
including Richard Nixon, Joseph McCarthy, J. Edgar Hoover,
John Wayne, William Powell, Elizabeth Taylor, Mel Ferrer,
and La Jolla native Gregory Peck. Charro in Spanish is a
costumed horseman.

History

First constructed in June 1931, as a riding club, the
predecessor to the del Charro was located at the junction of La Jolla
Canyon (now Torrey Pines Road) and Ardath Road (now La Jolla Parkway)
on a 4-acre tract.  Until 1937, it was run by a Miss Jean Moore, after
which it was purchased by a Captain W.W. Beckwith, who operated it as
La Jolla Riding Stables.

About 1945, the property was sold to Mr. and Mrs. J.R. Marechal, of Texas,
who converted it to a motor hotel with riding facilities, opening as
the Rancho del Charro in 1948.  Because of its proximity to the La Jolla Playhouse,
which had been founded by Gregory Peck, Dorothy McGuire, and Mel Ferrer in 1947,
the hotel soon hosted many Hollywood
and Broadway celebrities.

In 1951 the Marechals sold the property to a Nevada corporation widely
understood (by insiders) to be controlled by Texas billionaires
Clint Murchison and Sid Richardson. (E.g., funds
for the purchase were borrowed from an insurance company owned by
Murchison.) Renamed the "Hotel del Charro", the buildings were remodeled and a
swimming pool was added.  Thereafter, one or another of the co-owners
were frequently in residence at the hotel.

Heyday
“Serious citizens in La Jolla tend to feel that Hotel del Charro is a
Texas enclave, not too much concerned with the town’s welfare,”
observed a local in 1954.  By then, the hotel was nationally famous.  A New
York Times piece on San Diego's post-war boom described it as a
"fabulous hostelry" with every guest room having either a private
patio, sundeck, or balcony.  "Its restaurant, built around a huge
jacaranda tree, has not one chef, but two, one imported from Scotland,
the other from Palm Springs."  The pool was described as "Texas-size",
crescent-shaped, with pool-side cabanas.

Celebrity guests of the time included John Wayne, Elizabeth Taylor,
William Powell, Jimmy Durante, and Betty Grable, along with
Murchison's Texas oilman friends Effie and Wofford Cain, Emily and Billy Byars,
and Jodie and Pug Miller.  A Texas flag flew overhead, and there was
a Dow-Jones stock ticker machine in the lobby.

Close to the Del Mar racetrack (itself later acquired by Murchison
and Richardson), the hotel attracted wealthy horse-race aficionados.
A 1956 article in the Daily Racing Form by the hotel's own general
manager gave this description of racing season at the hotel: "The
chauffeurs arrive from town with the longest and blackest of the
General Motors products. All are air-conditioned, about the same
length as a Pullman car, and a trifle less expensive. One of these
belongs to oil tycoon Roy Woods, who has a dollar for every drop
of water in Niagara Falls. Bob Bowden, the 6-foot 6-inch maître
d’hôtel, is discussing J. Edgar Hoover’s dinner for Vice President
Nixon with the chef."

Hoover, along with companion Clyde Tolson, was
accustomed to staying at the hotel for two weeks every year during
racing season, occupying "Bungalow A", one of the hotel's stand-alone cabins.
Columnist Jack Anderson
reported in 1971 that Hoover's bill was always "comped" by the hotel's
owners.  According to Anderson, manager Witwer told him that over the
years Hoover ran up a total tab of $15,000.

Hoover sometimes entertained guests in his bungalow, one of whom was
Arthur Samish, a lobbyist who was said to represent organized crime
interests in the liquor industry, and another of whom was
Howard Hughes.  On first entering the bungalow, Hughes
reportedly asked for Hoover's assurance that the premises
were not bugged.

Senator Joseph McCarthy was another frequent guest.  “McCarthy was
virtually on Murchison’s payroll,” manager Allan Witwer related.
“He’d get drunk and jump in the pool, sometimes naked. He urinated
outside his cabana, flew everywhere in Murchison’s plane.”
Eventually, after one drunken brawl too many, McCarthy was declared
persona non grata at the hotel.
Joan Crawford was another celebrity declared persona non grata,
reportedly for flirting excessively with billionaire co-owner Richardson.

Physicist Leo Szilard, famous as author of the Einstein–Szilárd letter to
President Roosevelt, lived with his wife Trudy for many years until his death in 1964
in one of the more elaborate bungalows on the property.  His guests
from time to time included Niels Bohr, Edward Teller, and other famous physicists.

Last days
The Hotel del Charro finally closed in the early 1970s.  The buildings
were razed and replaced by condominiums, now known as "Del Charro Woods".
Some of the larger trees are original to the property.

In popular culture
The Hotel del Charro plays a prominent role under the fictitious name
"Rancho Descansado" in Raymond Chandler's final
Philip Marlowe novel, Playback. Chandler had
lived in La Jolla, which
has become "Esmerelda" in the novel, for the previous decade.  A cab driver character
describes the place as, "Bungalows with car ports.  Some single,
some double.  Office in a small one down front.  Rates pretty steep
in season."  Marlowe and other characters are attacked on the premises.

References

Defunct hotels in California
La Jolla, San Diego